Lomnessjøen is a lake in Rendalen Municipality in Innlandet county, Norway. The villages Åkre and Otnes are located on the shores of the lake. The lake is part of the Renaelva river system. The Renaelva river flows into the lake from the north.

See also
List of lakes in Norway

References

Rendalen
Lakes of Innlandet